Dženan Osmanović (born 24 January 2000) is a Bosnian professional footballer who plays as a defensive midfielder.

References

External links
Dženan Osmanović at Sofascore

2000 births
Living people
Footballers from Sarajevo
Bosnia and Herzegovina footballers
Premier League of Bosnia and Herzegovina players
First League of the Federation of Bosnia and Herzegovina players
FK Željezničar Sarajevo players
FK Radnik Hadžići players
FK Igman Konjic players
Bosnia and Herzegovina youth international footballers
Association football midfielders